is a Japanese animation studio based in Hokkaido that was founded in March 2017.

Works

Television series

References

External links

  
 

 
Japanese animation studios
Japanese companies established in 2017
Mass media companies established in 2017
Companies based in Hokkaido